The Eighteen Touches or Shiba Mo is a traditional Chinese folk song with many variants throughout China. The song is flirtatious, bawdy and erotic in nature, considered vulgar and tasteless it has been banned numerous times.

There are male, female, and duet variants. Some versions start with a touch of the hair, followed by nape, with each subsequent touch becoming increasingly intimate. The female versions often feature an attempted seduction through offering to allow a man to touch her in various places, some male versions a seduction through promising some reward if she allows him to touch her there. The duets pair each offered or threatened touch with a consequence, e.g. "...I can't touch you there, if I do you'll die of bliss."

The song has appeared in Chinese literature especially books that which features the common people, such as Mo Yan's White Cotton, the song is also a favourite of Jin Yong's fictional character Wei Xiaobao. The song also provides the inspiration for one of the main themes of  Puccini’s Madama Butterfly.

As a  living folk song, new variants continue to be written. For example, salacious details from recent news stories are incorporated to mock officials and current events with sexual innuendo.

References

External links
 民间小调《十八摸》 (Chinese)

Chinese folk songs
Songwriter unknown
Year of song unknown